Navy Cyber Forces (CYBERFOR) was the type commander for the U.S. Navy's global cyber workforce.  The headquarters was located at 115 Lake View Parkway in Suffolk, Virginia.  CYBERFOR provided forces and equipment in cryptology/signals intelligence, cyber, electronic warfare, information operations, intelligence, networks, and space. Navy Cyber Forces was an operational component of the U.S. Navy Information Dominance Corps. CYBERFOR has been absorbed into the Naval Information Forces command.

Mission
To organize and prioritize, training, modernization, and maintenance, requirements, and capabilities of command and control architecture/networks, cryptologic and space-related systems and intelligence and information operations activities, and to coordinate with Type Commanders,  to deliver interoperable, relevant and ready forces at the right time at the best cost, today and in the future.

Organization
CYBERFOR was the U.S. Navy C5I Type Commander responsible to man, train and equip all C5I forces afloat and ashore.  They reported to Fleet Forces Command.

Reporting Commands
Navy and Marine Corps Spectrum Center 
Navy Communications Security Material System Command 
Fleet Intelligence Adaptive Force (FIAFs)
Fleet Intelligence Detachments (FIDs)

See also
 U.S. Navy Information Forces
 Fleet Cyber Command/Tenth Fleet
 Information Warfare Corps
 United States Cyber Command

References

External links
U.S. Navy Cyber Forces

Commands of the United States Navy
Military units and formations of the United States Navy